Jack Rasmussen (born 9 February 1923) was a Danish wrestler. He competed in the men's Greco-Roman lightweight at the 1952 Summer Olympics.

References

External links
 

1923 births
Possibly living people
Danish male sport wrestlers
Olympic wrestlers of Denmark
Wrestlers at the 1952 Summer Olympics
Sportspeople from Frederiksberg